L'Atelier Animation is a Canadian animation company.

History
L'Atelier Animation was formed in 2012 as a partnership between Laurent Zeitoun and Yann Zenou to produce the film Ballerina. In early 2017, L'Atelier announced plans to make Fireheart, a film set in the 1920s New York City that tells the story of a 16-year-old girl who becomes a hero to save her city. The company also makes the animated series Robozuna, which airs on ITV and Netflix. In 2022, L'Atelier was acquired by Cinesite.

Filmography

Upcoming films

References 

2014 establishments in Canada
Canadian animation studios
2022 mergers and acquisitions